Andrea Zafferani (born 19 December 1982) is a Sammarinese politician, who was a Captain Regent of San Marino together with Giovanni Francesco Ugolini for the semester from 1 October 2010 to 1 April 2011.

Career
In the 2012 general election he ran on the Civic 10 list and was re-elected to the Grand and General Council. To date, he is the first democratically elected head of state or government in the world to have been born in the 1980s.

References

1982 births
People from Fiorentino
Captains Regent of San Marino
Members of the Grand and General Council
Living people
Popular Alliance (San Marino) politicians
Civic 10 politicians